Belakovskiite is a very rare uranium mineral with the formula Na7(UO2)(SO4)4(SO3OH)(H2O)3. It is interesting in being a natural uranyl salt with hydrosulfate anion, a feature shared with meisserite. Other chemically related minerals include fermiite, oppenheimerite, natrozippeite and plášilite. Most of these uranyl sulfate minerals was originally found in the Blue Lizard mine, San Juan County, Utah, US. The mineral is named after Russian mineralogist Dmitry Ilych Belakovskiy.

Association
Belakovskiite is associated with other sulfate minerals: meisserite, blödite, ferrinatrite, kröhnkite, and metavoltine. This association is found as efflorescences on a sandstone associated with uranium mineralization.

Crystal structure
The framework of belakovskiite crystal structure is a hexavalent cluster with composition (UO2)(SO4)4(H2O). Such clusters are connected via Na-O and hydrogen bonds.

References

Uranium(VI) minerals
Sulfate minerals
Sodium minerals
Triclinic minerals
Minerals in space group 2